John Fishbaugher (born October 7, 1985) is a former American soccer player.

Career

Youth and College
Fishbaugher attended Redmond High School, where he was an All State soccer player, finishing his career with the school’s career assists record.  He then entered Seattle University, playing twenty-three games his freshman season as Seattle won the Division II NCAA soccer championship. In 2007, he was a first team All American.  He graduated in 2008 with a bachelor’s degree in biology.

In 2007 Fishbaugher spent the collegiate off-season with the Tacoma Tide of the USL Premier Development League.

Professional
In 2008, Fishbaugher signed with the Seattle Sounders of the USL First Division, and played in 18 games for the team in the final season in the USL. He trialled with Major League Soccer expansion franchise Seattle Sounders FC in early 2009, but was not offered a contract with the team, and subsequently signed for Seattle Wolves for the 2009 season.  In the 2010 season he played with Kitsap Pumas, and was twice selected by fans as the Man of the Match.

In 2011, he signed with the Washington Crossfire (formerly the Seattle Wolves), largely because the time-consuming commute to Bremerton would conflict with his goal of attending medical school, while the Crossfire now plays in Redmond.

References

External links
 Sounders player profile

1985 births
Living people
American soccer players
Seattle Sounders FC U-23 players
Seattle Sounders (1994–2008) players
Washington Crossfire players
Kitsap Pumas players
USL First Division players
USL League Two players
Seattle University alumni
Sportspeople from King County, Washington
Soccer players from Washington (state)
Seattle Redhawks men's soccer players
Association football midfielders